Clawful is a fictional supervillain in the Masters of the Universe toy line and the accompanying cartoon series He-Man and the Masters of the Universe.

He is a member of the Evil Warriors. He appears to be a hybrid between a man and a crab or lobster, with large, sharp claws that can crush the life out of his opponents. In most media, his right claw is extra large and thus achieves an extra-deadly grip.

Character history

1980s
Clawful was introduced into the Masters of the Universe toy line in 1984 as part of the third wave of figures. He uses the standard Evil Warrior "Skeletor" body, with a new head and right arm sculpt (with spring-loaded claw). His left arm uses the same mold as Buzz-Off, released in the same wave. He carries a bright green version of the mace weapon originally included in the Castle Grayskull playset, with an additional 'handle' allowing him to carry it in his left claw.

There are two versions of the Clawful figure. One uses the "bumpy legs" mold used with other figures such as Buzz-Off. The second version uses the standard Evil Warrior 'claw' leg mold. Additionally, typical examples of the figure have a 'squeezable' soft heads, but some examples can be found with harder, rubber heads.

However, unlike most third wave figures, which did not make appearances in the cartoon series until the show's second season, Clawful makes his debut on the accompanying cartoon series by Filmation in 1983, late into the show's first season. His appearance on the cartoon is significantly different from the appearance of his action figure. His fin like spikes down the back of his head stick more than the pointy bumps on the back of his toy counterpart, which makes his head look almost reptile (or even dragon) like and unlike the action figure. This could possibly be due to his animated design being based on a very early prototype of the figure, which would explain some of the differences in appearance (or more likely, the possible danger of kids playing with spiky toys). Additionally, both his claws are the same size, the reason for this being to make his character symmetrical so animation cels could be flipped over without his large claw constantly switching sides.

Introduced in the episode "Dree Elle's Return", Clawful receives a strong introduction as lead villain of the episode. Having stolen an artifact called the Horn of Evil from Orko's homeworld of Trolla, Clawful is portrayed as a strong, harsh commander to the bumbling Trap-Jaw who assists him throughout the episode. He makes his second appearance a few episodes later in "Castle of Heroes" in which Skeletor describes him as his "right-hand man" and he is portrayed as such throughout the episode, as a loyal sidekick to Skeletor, whom Skeletor seems to respect more than most of his other warriors. Although his introduction seems to indicate he is a rung above the other villains, this is not expanded upon throughout his later appearances, most of which portray him as just another of Skeletor's henchmen, albeit more intelligent and slightly more responsible than most others.

His most prominent episode of the show's second season is "Things That Go Bump in the Night", which indicates that Skeletor's apparent respect for him, as demonstrated in "Castle of Heroes", has waned, as Skeletor is shown to be aggressive and distrustful towards Clawful, who in this episode vows that he will someday overthrow Skeletor as leader of the Evil Warriors. Clawful seems to possess more confidence than Skeletor's other minions in that out of all of the Evil Warriors who make this statement for themselves throughout the series, Clawful is the only one bold enough to say it to Skeletor's face, and he is also seen to sarcastically laugh off Skeletor's abuse with a confidence few other evil warriors ever exhibit.

2002 series
Clawful is re-used in the 2002 relaunch of the Masters of the Universe cartoon series. Despite being one of the first characters designed by the Four Horsemen for the new toyline, the line was canceled before his figure could be released. In 2004, a mini statue of the character was produced by NECA.

Clawful's portrayal in the modern incarnation is radically different from his 1980s counterpart. Rather than being one of Skeletor's more intelligent and responsible villains, Clawful is presented as being the stupidest and most bumbling of them all, used purely for comedy value without the faintest hint of intelligence. Although he appears frequently throughout the series, his roles are generally minimal, only serving to contribute the occasional comical moment with his dim-witted statements and bunglings of schemes.

The only episode to give him a spotlight role is "The Island", in which we are introduced to his race, a race of crab-like creatures who populate a small island. Clawful's cousin plays a larger role than Clawful in this episode, and also seems significantly more intelligent. Clawful is shown to be so dim-witted that he does not even recognize the long-range communications of his own race: Morse-code-like messages relayed via a snapping of the claws.

Further reading
 The Art of He-Man and the Masters of the Universe, Dark Horse Books (2015)
 Mastering the Universe: He-man and the Rise and Fall of a Billion-dollar Idea by Roger Sweet and David Wecker, Clerisy Press (2005)
 He-Man and She-Ra: A Complete Guide to the Classic Animated Adventures by James Eatock, Dark Horse Books (2016)

References

Villains in animated television series
Fictional anthropomorphic characters
Television characters introduced in 1983
Fictional crustaceans
Fictional humanoids
Fictional human hybrids
Masters of the Universe Evil Warriors
Male characters in animated series
Male supervillains